Sao Sao Sao was a Thai pop music trio that performed from 1981 to 1989. The group consisted of Saowaluk Leelaboot, Patcharida Wattana, and Orawan Yenpoonsuk then contract on record label Rod fai don tri They are considered to be one of the most successful Thai girl groups.

Discography

Album
Rak Pug Jai (รักปักใจ) (1982)
Pra Too Jai (ประตูใจ) (1983)
Pen Fan Gun Dai Young Ngai (เป็นแฟนกันได้ยังไง) (1984)
Ha Khon Ruam Fun (หาคนร่วมฝัน) (1984)
Nai Wai Rien (ในวัยเรียน) (1985)
Mak Mai Lae Sai Tarn (แมกไม้และสายธาร) (1986)
Because I Love You (1987)
Wow..w! (ว้าว..ว!) (1988)
Together (1988)
Dokmai Kong Narm Jai (ดอกไม้ของน้ำใจ) (1990)

History 
Sao Sao Sao's first sang together on public in 1977 at Music Square of Channel 3. In 1981 Raya, the founder of Rod fai don tri (Music Train) tried to find girl groups for the label so he asked the singer trainer's school for find their singers but the school couldn't find any girl singers but the school introduced Chantana's daughter (Amp Saowaluk) and granddaughter (Pum Orawan) and Suda Chunbarn's daughter (Mam Patcharida) for Music Train's girlgroup. Sao Sao Sao made first album "Ruk Puk Jai" in 1981 and released in 1982 but the album is bad-selling because the musics are too elder to their ages. In 1983 they released second album "Pra Tu Jai". This album was very good-selling for 300,000 copies and in 1984 "Pen Fan Gun Dai Yung Ngai" became their best-selling for 400,000 copies. They made other albums continuously. Then, they made first foreign language album "Because I Love You" in 1987. There were English and Japanese songs. In 1988 "Wow..w!" very changed Sao Sao Sao's style but it was their worst-selling album lesser than 10,000 copies. In same year they made second foreign language album "Together" but unsuccessful too. In 1990 they decided to end Sao Sao Sao because of higher education and ages so they made their last album "Dok Mai Khong Nam Jai" a song (Dokmai khong namjai) is bilingual language (Thai-Japanese). Then Sao Sao Sao disbanded. Amp became Grammy's songwriter and singer. Mam and Pum became RS's singer trainer but cancelled for their own business.

References 

 Sao Sao Sao สาว สาว สาว oknation.net

Thai pop music groups
Thai girl groups